Bottle Caps are sweet tablet candies made to look like metal soda bottle caps in grape, cola, orange, root beer, and cherry flavors. Bottle Caps candy was originally introduced by Breaker Confections in 1972. They are currently sold by the Ferrara Candy Company.

Bottle Caps have a tart but slightly sweet taste to them, not wholly dissimilar to Smarties Candy Company's Smarties (Rockets outside the U.S.), SweeTarts or Runts, but with soda flavors and altered shapes. Bottle Caps were originally sold in green pouches. They currently are available in purple packages weighing  and containing approximately 24 pieces.

In the past, Bottle Caps contained a lemon-lime flavor instead of the current cherry flavor. There was also a time when Willy Wonka Co. made Fizzy Bottle Caps. These were similar to the original but contained ingredients to make them fizz when eaten, making them a bit more flavorful.

In early 2009, individual Bottle Caps candy was made much smaller. The underside was flattened, and no longer resembles the underside of a bottle cap.

See also
 List of confectionery brands

References

External links
 
 

The Willy Wonka Candy Company brands
Candy
Brand name confectionery
Products introduced in 1972